Archery at the 2019 African Games was held from 27 to 30 August 2019 in Salé, Morocco.

This is the first time archery is included at the African Games.

The event served as a qualifier for the 2020 Summer Olympics in Tokyo, Japan.

Schedule

Participating nations

Results

Men

Women

Mixed

Medal table

References

External links
Results
Results book

2019 African Games
African Games
2019 African Games
2019